This is a list of number-one dance hits as recorded by RPM magazine's Top 30 Dance chart — a weekly national survey of popular songs in Canada dance clubs.

Below are links to lists showing the songs that have topped the chart.  Dates shown represent "week-ending" Billboard issue dates. Note that no chart was published from January 1980 until September 3, 1988. 


1970s
 1976
 1977
 1978
 1979

1980s
 1988
 1989

1990s
 1990
 1991
 1992
 1993
 1994
 1995
 1996
 1997
 1998
 1999

2000s
 2000

References
Citations

Dance
RPM electronic dance music chart
Dance Singles